The Microregion of Sorocaba is a microregion in the central part of São Paulo State, Brazil.

Municipalities 
The microregion consists of the following municipalities:
 Alumínio
 Araçariguama
 Araçoiaba da Serra
 Cabreúva
 Capela do Alto
 Iperó
 Itu
 Mairinque
 Porto Feliz
 Salto
 Salto de Pirapora
 São Roque
 Sarapuí
 Sorocaba
 Votorantim

Economy 

Many people travel to São Paulo to work during the week, particularly from the larger of the municipalities. Those who work in São Paulo and thereby earn higher wages than obtainable locally can usually afford larger houses due to the lower cost of living outside of São Paulo. In the smaller towns such as Votorantim there is a lot of agricultural employment.

References

Sorocaba